Tujia may refer to:

the Tujia people
the Tujia language
Tujia.com, a Chinese "unicorn startup company"

Language and nationality disambiguation pages